is a Japanese footballer currently playing as a defender for Albirex Niigata (S), on loan from Renofa Yamaguchi.

Career statistics

Club
.

Notes

References

External links

2001 births
Living people
Japanese footballers
Japanese expatriate footballers
Association football defenders
Renofa Yamaguchi FC players
Albirex Niigata Singapore FC players
Japanese expatriate sportspeople in Singapore
Expatriate footballers in Singapore